The Guildford Greenbelt Group is a small political party within the United Kingdom which seeks to preserve the green belt surrounding Guildford in Surrey.

The group was founded in 2013 and the party was registered with the Electoral Commission in 2014.

Its chair, Susan Parker, stood in Guildford in the 2015 general election coming in 6th place with 538 votes (1.0%) 

Standing in some wards in the Borough of Guildford in the 2015 local elections, the party gained its first three councillors, and secured 20,614 votes across the borough. At the 2019 local elections the party increased its Borough Council representation to four seats.

References

External links
 

Guildford
Political parties established in 2014
Locally based political parties in England
2014 establishments in England
Green belts in the United Kingdom